Buzz! Junior: Jungle Party is a party video game developed by Magenta Software. Initially released in 2006 for PlayStation 2, it is the first game in the Buzz! Junior series.
Jungle Party comprises forty different mini-games (twenty-five in the US version). Many of these mini-games require little knowledge or skill, so that they are more suited to younger children than the normal Buzz! quiz games, although they can also be enjoyed by older children or even adults. Cohort Studios developed a PlayStation 3 version where the player can use a Dualshock wireless controller for the 1st time, yet is limited to only 5 playable mini-games.

The game received mixed reviews, and was a British Academy Children's Awards winner.

A PSP version of the game was released in November 2010.

Gameplay 
Jungle Party is designed in a way that kids would be able to play it. Up to 4 people can play all the 40 mini-games, with Liz Barker as a narrator. Some of them include skydiving, colour matching, stealing an ostrich's egg and shooting balloons. Each game has a specific objective, with maximum points given by completing twenty of those in one round.

Every player can pick their own coloured monkey, either blue, orange, green or yellow, and controls them using their Buzz! Buzzer. Each controller has four coloured buttons with a red buzzer on top. Some games simply use the Buzz! button, while others use the four coloured buttons. In addition, there is a single-player mode which features customized versions of the multi-player games. After playing through ten games, a final score will be given (out of 80,000 overall) with a ranking on the leaderboard.

Reception 

Jungle Party has received "mixed or average" reviews holding an aggregate score of 70% on Metacritic. IGN noted that there was a lot of rehash with just the setting changed, while adding that more variety would probably appeal to a wider audience. VideoGamer wrote that despite the fact that Jungle Party looks pretty simple, it has enough mini-games to keep players interested for a while. Luke Van Leuveren of PALGN thought that single-player part isn't really deep or appealing, with multi-player giving the most entertainment to the players.

Critics found that the controls are responsive, and designed for everyone to use. The transitions between animations and colorful have been praised. Some reviewers considered the simplicity of the mini-games as something that gives the game a lack of depth and wide appeal.

In November 2007, the game was a winner of the British Academy Children's Awards in the Video Game category.

References

External links
 Official website

2006 video games
PlayStation 2 games
PlayStation 3 games
PlayStation Network games
PlayStation Portable games
Party video games
Buzz!
Video games about primates
Video games developed in the United Kingdom
Multiplayer and single-player video games
Cohort Studios games
Sony Interactive Entertainment games
Magenta Software games